Joy Lauren Jorgensen (born ) is an American producer, director and writer and former actress. She is known for playing Danielle Van de Kamp on the ABC comedy-drama series Desperate Housewives.

Life and career
Lauren was born Lauren Joy Jorgensen in Atlanta, Georgia. Lauren is of Danish descent. She lived in the Vail, Colorado area from age 1 to 4. She attended the Galloway School and appeared in several productions by the Alliance Theatre. At age 11, she moved from Atlanta to Los Angeles with her mother to pursue an acting career. She graduated from high school at age 14.  She graduated from  Columbia University in 2012, where she majored in American history. She later received Master's Degree in Screenwriting and Directing at the New York University Tisch School of the Arts.

Jorgensen is founder of Killjoy Films. She produced and directed a number of independent and short films.

Filmography

References

External links
 
 Interview with TheStarScoop, January 2007

1989 births
Living people
21st-century American actresses
Actresses from Atlanta
American child actresses
American film actresses
American people of Danish descent
Columbia College (New York) alumni
American television actresses